The 2007 Imo State gubernatorial election was the sixth gubernatorial election of Imo State. Held on April 14, 2011, the Progressive Peoples Alliance nominee Ikedi Ohakim won the election, defeating Ifeanyi Ararume of the People's Democratic Party.

Results 
A total of 16 candidates contested in the election. Ikedi Ohakim from the Progressive Peoples Alliance won the election, defeating Ifeanyi Ararume from the People's Democratic Party. Registered voters was 1,372,975.

References 

Imo State gubernatorial elections
Imo gubernatorial
April 2007 events in Nigeria